The Little River Railroad is a heritage railroad located in Coldwater, Michigan. The train runs to Quincy, Michigan and occasionally Hillsdale, Michigan.

It is dedicated to the restoration and operation of historic railroad equipment such as steam locomotives. The railroad began operations in 1975.

The railroad operates passenger train excursions from Memorial Day weekend through the last weekend in October with eight Christmas excursions in December, along parts of the former Lake Shore and Michigan Southern Railway, later New York Central, now owned by the Indiana Northeastern Railroad section named "The Old Road."

Locomotives

Source

Rolling Stock

Source

See also

List of heritage railroads in the United States
Non-profit organization

References

External links
Railroad's website

Tourist attractions in Branch County, Michigan
Heritage railroads in Michigan